Lotus blossom refers to the pink or white flower of lotus plant Nelumbo nucifera. It  may also refer to:

 Lotus Blossom (film), a 1921 Chinese film
 Lotus Blossom (My Little Pony), one of the My Little Pony Earth ponies
 Lotus Blossom (album), a 1995 album by Kenny Burrell